Pulane Ivonne Motloung (born 3 October 1985 ) is a women's rugby union player from Newcastle, Madadeni, Kwazulu Natal, raised in the free state farms South Africa. She played for the Falcons, Blue Bulls, and Lions women's teams and the South Africa women's national rugby union team, also a former tuks ladies rugby team player and a coach.

Career 
She played in the 2010 Women's Rugby World Cup

References

External links
 http://www.sarugby.co.za/article.aspx?id=420549

Living people
1985 births
South Africa national rugby union team captains
Blue Bulls players
Women of African descent
South African female rugby union players
Rugby union flankers